The Critics' Choice Super Award for Best Superhero Series is an award presented to the best television series in the superhero genre presented by the Critics Choice Association.

Winners and Nominees

Series with multiple nominations 
 Doom Patrol (DC Universe/HBO Max) – 3
 The Boys (Amazon Prime Video), Lucifer (Netflix) – 2

References

Broadcast Film Critics Association Awards